The 10th ceremony of the Premios Feroz, presented by the Asociación de Informadores Cinematográficos de España, took place at the Auditorio de Zaragoza in Zaragoza, Spain, on 28 January 2023, to recognize the best in Spanish cinema and television. This marks the second time in a row that the ceremony takes place in Zaragoza.

The nominations were announced by actors Mina El Hammani and Carlos Cuevas through a live-stream from the Pablo Gargallo Museum on 24 November 2022. The category for Best Screenplay in a Series was added. The Beasts led the nominations with ten, followed by Lullaby with seven and Piggy with six, while The Route led the television categories with six nominations. Director Pedro Almodóvar received the Honorary Award. The gala co-hosted by former hosts of previous editions of the Feroz Awards (Paula Púa, Bárbara Santa-Cruz, Ingrid García-Jonsson, Silvia Abril, Nacho Vigalondo, and Pilar Castro).

The Beasts and Lullaby received the most awards of the night with three each, the former also won Best Drama Film. In the television categories, Atresplayer Premium series The Route won three awards, including Best Drama Series.

Winners and nominees
The nominations were announced on 24 November 2022. The nominations for the Feroz Arrebato awards for fiction and non-fiction were announced on 15 December 2022.

Film

Series

Honorary Award
 Pedro Almodóvar

See also
 37th Goya Awards
 15th Gaudí Awards
 2nd Carmen Awards

References

External links
 Official website

Feroz
January 2023 events in Spain
Zaragoza
21st century in Aragon